Grossenbacher is a family name of Swiss-German origin that may refer to:

Christian Grossenbacher (born 1980), Swiss hurdler and 2009 World Military Champion
Martha Grossenbacher (born 1959), Swiss sprint athlete
Pascale Grossenbacher (born 1978), Swiss female artistic gymnast
Roland Grossenbacher, Swiss attorney at law

See also
Grossenbacher Nunatak, Antarctic location

German-language surnames